The EGG file format is a compressed archive file format that supports Unicode and intelligent compression algorithms. The EGG format was created by ESTsoft, and was first applied in their file compression software ALZip.

The filename extension used by EGG is .egg . If an EGG archive is split into multiple smaller files, those files use the .egg extension by placing .volX (X for sequence number starting from 1) ahead of it, i.e. .vol1.egg, .vol2.egg, .vol3.egg, and so on.

Features
The EGG format supports the following features:

 Store file names in Unicode
 AES-256 encryption
 Support for solid compression option to decide the best compression method, that is, analyzes the files to be compressed then chooses whether to compress faster or to prioritize on compression ratio
 Unlimited number of splitting into smaller pieces of archives

According to the licensing policy from ESTsoft, the EGG package includes source from zlib, bzip2, and lzma.

Software
 ALZip software can compress and extract the EGG file format.

References

External links
EGG Format Specification
RAR Password Recovery
UnEGG Source Code For Linux 

Archive formats